The Barauni–Katihar, Saharsa and Purnia sections  of the Barauni–Guwahati line connects Barauni, Saharsa, Purnia and Katihar in the Indian state of Bihar .

History

Early developments
Railway development on the northern side of the Ganges in Bihar came up soon after the opening of the Howrah–Delhi main line on the southern side of the Ganges in 1866. Several railway companies were involvedEast Indian Railway, Assam Behar State Railway, and Tirhut State Railway.  In his book The Indian Empire, Its People, History and Products (first published in 1886) W.W.Hunter, says "The Tirhut State Railway with its various branches  intersects Northern Behar and is intended to extend to the Nepal frontier  on one side and to Assam on the other." However, early developments appear to be scattered. EIR built the Katihar–Kasba and Katihar–Manihari lines in 1887. Assam Behar State Railway built the Parbatipur–Katihar line (see Barsoi–Parbatipur line) in 1889, thereby linking Assam and parts of North Bengal with Bihar. Tirhoot State Railway built some longer lines such as Samastipur–Khagaria, and added branch lines such as the 7 miles long Barauni–Semaria Ghat in 1883, the 11 miles long Thana Bihpur to Bararighat in 1901 and Khagaria to Hasanpur Road in 1915. Most of these early metre-gauge lines got interconnected in subsequent years.

Bridge links

Railway reorganization
The Avadh–Tirhut Railway (successor to Tirhut State Railway) was merged with Assam Railway (successor to Eastern Bengal Railway and Assam Bengal Railway) in 1952 to create North Eastern Railway. Northeast Frontier Railway was carved out of North Eastern Railway in 1958. East Central Railway was constituted in 2002 with the Sonpur and Samastipur Divisions of North Eastern Railway, and Danapur, Mughalsarai and Dhanbad Divisions of Eastern Railway.

Gallery

Locale
The entire track lies on the northern side of the Ganges and traverses the Kosi basin. In Bihar, the Kosi is widely referred to as the "Sorrow of Bihar" as it has caused widespread human suffering over the centuries through flooding and frequent changes in course. In August 2008, it picked up an old channel it had abandoned over a century ago near the Nepal–India border, and caused enormous damage in a wide area covering several districts. The breach in the Kosi embankment which caused the devastating flood in 2008, was repaired in 2009 and the river has since been flowing along its original course. The floods continue and threaten even the Barauni–Katihar tracks. The entire region portrays "a bleak picture of broken houses, flattened fields and ravaged lives, signs of all the havoc the previous floods and land erosion wreaked here earlier."

Gauge conversion
Gauge conversion work (from metre gauge to broad gauge) in the Barauni–Katihar section was taken up in 1978–79 and completed in 1982. In year 2001 Khagaria-Saharsa route was converted into broad gauge. Katihar–Jogbani route was converted into broad gauge in year 2009. The second main route of this section, Saharsa–Purnia route was converted into broad gauge in 2016. Gauge conversion of Saharsa–Forbesganj and Banmankhi–Bihariganj is on progress.

Electrification
As of 2011, work on electrification of Barabanki–Gorakhpur–Barauni–New Jalpaiguri route was in progress. Adequate funds have been provided in the budget for 2011–12 to take up work in the New Jalapiguri–New Bongaigaon–Guwahati section.
The section is fully electrified. Most of the Delhi and Amritsar-bound trains run on electric locomotives. Amrapali Express was the first train to run on electric locomotive, then after Rajdhani Express, North-east Express, Purvottar Sampark Kranti Express, Seemanchal Express, Tripura Sundari Express have electric engines.

References

External links
   Trains at Barauni
   Trains at Katihar

|

5 ft 6 in gauge railways in India
Railway lines in Bihar
Transport in Katihar
Transport in Barauni